Howe High School is a secondary school located in the rural town of Howe, Oklahoma. The school educates students in 9th–12th grades.

The mascot of Howe High School is the lion. As of 2017, the school principal is Dennis Shoup. In 2004, their girls basketball team won the Class A state championship. In 2007, the girls basketball team won state runner-up. In 2008, the girls basketball team won the Class A State Championship. Tammy Parks, Carrie Alexander and Scott Parks serve as the Instructional Technology Facilitators for Howe Public Schools.

Howe High School offers a Broadcast Journalism Program called Cle-Live Online.

External links
 Howe Public Schools

Public high schools in Oklahoma
Schools in Le Flore County, Oklahoma